Skerhólmur is a small islet in the middle of Sørvágsfjørður on the island of Vágar, Faroe Islands.
It is uninhabited.

Islets of the Faroe Islands
Uninhabited islands of the Faroe Islands
Vágar